The Communist Party of Kenya (CPK) is a communist party in Kenya.

History 

The party was established in 1992 as the Social Democratic Party (SDP) by Johnstone Makau. The party did not nominate a presidential candidate in the December 1992 general elections, and received only 177 votes in the National Assembly elections.

Charity Ngilu joined the party before the 1997 elections, and was selected as the party's presidential candidate. She finished fifth in a field of 15 candidates with 7.9% of the vote. The party also won 15 seats in the National Assembly. Ngilu left the party after the elections, and in 2001 was succeeded as party chairman by James Orengo. He stood as the party's presidential candidate in the 2002 elections, but received just 0.4% of the vote; the party also lost all 15 seats in the National Assembly. Its vote share was reduced to 0.4% in the 2007 general elections, in which it fielded 24 candidates. It also failed to win seats in the 2013 elections, receiving only 0.15% of the vote with seven candidates.

The party adopted its current name and programme in 2019, later garnering mild internet fame in February 2022 after one of its campaign videos went viral.

Mwandawiro Mghanga was the party chairman until an internal split in 2022.

CPK member Felix Musili was reportedly killed by officers of the Kenya Police at his parents' home in Kitui County on 11 January 2023. Mwingi Central MP Gideon Mulyungi expressed his condolences to Musili's family and called for the Independent Policing Oversight Authority to investigate the matter. The Communist Party of Swaziland and Communist Party of Venezuela released official statements condemning the killing.

Electoral history

Presidential elections

National Assembly elections

Senate elections

References

1992 establishments in Kenya
Communism in Kenya
Communist parties in Africa
International Coordination of Revolutionary Parties and Organizations
Political parties established in 1992
Political parties in Kenya